Momir Rnić (born 1 November 1987) is a Serbian handball player who plays for RK Metalurg Skopje and the Serbia national team.

Club career
Rnić started out at his hometown club Proleter Zrenjanin. He was promoted to the senior squad in the 2004–05 season. In 2008, Rnić moved abroad to Slovenia and signed with Gorenje Velenje. He helped them win the championship title in his debut year. In 2010, Rnić was transferred to fellow Slovenian team Celje.

International career

Youth
At youth level, Rnić was a member of the Serbia and Montenegro winning squad at the 2004 European Under-18 Championship. He subsequently helped his nation win the gold medal at the 2005 World Under-19 Championship.

Senior
A full Serbia international since 2009, Rnić made his major debut for the national team at the 2011 World Championship. He was also a member of the squad that finished as runners-up at the 2012 European Championship. Subsequently, Rnić was selected to compete at the 2012 Summer Olympics.

Personal life
Rnić is the son of fellow handball player Momir Rnić.

Honours
Gorenje Velenje
 Slovenian First League: 2008–09
 Slovenian Supercup: 2009
Celje
 Slovenian Supercup: 2010
Rhein-Neckar Löwen
 DHB-Pokal: 2017–18
 DHB-Supercup: 2017

References

External links

 Olympic record
 
 

1987 births
Living people
Sportspeople from Zrenjanin
Serbian male handball players
Competitors at the 2009 Mediterranean Games
Mediterranean Games medalists in handball
Mediterranean Games gold medalists for Serbia
Olympic handball players of Serbia
Handball players at the 2012 Summer Olympics
RK Proleter Zrenjanin players
Frisch Auf Göppingen players
MT Melsungen players
Rhein-Neckar Löwen players
Handball-Bundesliga players
Expatriate handball players
Serbian expatriate sportspeople in Slovenia
Serbian expatriate sportspeople in Germany
Serbian expatriate sportspeople in North Macedonia